Lorraine Vélez (born November 2, 1964) is an American singer and actress of Puerto Rican descent, who has specialized in musical theatre. Her name has sometimes appeared as Loraine Velez. She is the identical twin sister of actress Lauren Vélez.

Early life
Lauren and Lorraine's parents moved from Puerto Rico in the early 1950s and lived in Brooklyn, a borough of New York City. The twins were born in Brooklyn, New York.   They have five other sisters and one brother. Their father, a New York City Police Department officer, eventually bought a house in Far Rockaway, Queens, and moved there with his wife and eight children.  The twins enjoyed setting up improvised plays and acting for the family, and they participated in nearly all their high school productions, such as Fiddler on the Roof. After graduating from high school, they each received scholarships to attend the Alvin Ailey Dance School. They both went on to study acting at the Acting Studio with its founding artistic director James Price, the protégé and personal friend of Sanford Meisner.

Early career
Lorraine's first professional job was singing and acting for the Theater for the New City (TNC) in the East Village. She went on to play in  Dreamgirls at the Ambassador Theater on Broadway, and she performed in the off-Broadway production of Does a Tiger Wear a Necktie? She played Leah and Sister Hilton in the original Black Nativity at the Master Theater, Young Maria in Maria de Buenos Aires at Houston Grand Opera, and Anita in West Side Story at the Lakeview Theater, Virginia. In the independent film A Day Out of Days, she took the role of Roxanne. With a production of Blues in the Night, she toured throughout Central and South America, and she sang in Japan and France.

West End and Broadway career
In 1993, Vélez moved to London, where she worked regularly for a number of years on the West End stage.  She played Carmen in the original cast of the musical Fame, which opened to standing ovations at the Prince of Wales and Cambridge Theatres. Vélez recorded the title track of the Fame CD, which was released by Polydor Records. Fame also played at The Theatre Royal, Plymouth.

In addition, Lorraine played Hannah in Out of the Blue at the Shaftesbury Theatre, Lena Horne in Mama, I Want to Sing! at the Prince of Wales Theatre, and Gigi in Miss Saigon at the Theatre Royal, Drury Lane. In 1997, she featured as Heidi in the TV programme Frightmares. She then took part in the production of Rent at the Shaftesbury Theatre from 1998-2000, cast in the role of Mimi Marquez.

Vélez returned to the United States in 2000, performing the role of Mimi on Broadway at the Nederlander Theatre for almost two years. That same year, Vélez was cast as Tutu in the film Piñero, directed by Leon Ichaso, and starring Benjamin Bratt and Talisa Soto. She was a guest artist on The Rosie O'Donnell Show and HBO Latino in 2001, and in the following year she played Abby Bishop in the episode "Hitman" of the TV series Law & Order.

In 2004, Vélez moved back to London. She played Valentina Minola in the Casualty episode "Worse Things I Could Do", and the Spanish maid in the episode "Turn Left" of the cult British TV series Doctor Who (series 4, episode 11). At the Savoy Theatre in 2006-07, she played Clara and Bess, in Sir Trevor Nunn's new production of the musical Porgy and Bess. She also took part in his workshop for Gone with the Wind. The years 2008 and 2009 she spent on a Buddhist retreat in southern France. In August 2008, she sang for the Dalai Lama.

Vélez moved back to the United  States, and in New York in 2011-2, she starred in Luis Caballero's Off-Broadway musical DC7, The Life of Roberto Clemente, in the role of Clemente's wife, Vera Zabala. She took the show to Puerto Rico in 2012, and in the same year was awarded the New York Latin ACE Award for best actress in a musical production. In 2014, she again starred as Vera in Clemente: The Legend of 21, in Chicago and Pittsburgh. She continues to make TV and stage appearances, and she played Claudia in an episode of Elementary in 2015.

Personal life
Vélez is divorced with one adult son, Joaquin, born in 1998.

Filmography and stage roles

Television

Film

Broadway

West End

Off-Broadway & international

See also

List of Puerto Ricans-Actors, actresses, comedians and directors

References

External links

1964 births
Actresses from New York City
American film actresses
American actresses of Puerto Rican descent
American stage actresses
American television actresses
Identical twin actresses
Living people
People from Brooklyn
American twins
20th-century American actresses
21st-century American actresses
People from Far Rockaway, Queens